This is the results breakdown of the local elections held in the Region of Murcia on 8 May 1983. The following tables show detailed results in the autonomous community's most populous municipalities, sorted alphabetically.

City control
The following table lists party control in the most populous municipalities, including provincial capitals (shown in bold). Gains for a party are displayed with the cell's background shaded in that party's colour.

Municipalities

Cartagena
Population: 167,936

Lorca
Population: 61,879

Murcia
Population: 284,585

See also
1983 Murcian regional election

References

Murcia
1983